Valenciennellus is a genus of marine hatchetfishes. They are commonly known as constellationfishes.

Species
There are currently two recognized species in this genus:
 Valenciennellus carlsbergi Bruun, 1931
 Valenciennellus tripunctulatus (Esmark (sv), 1871) (Constellationfish)

Fossils of constellationfishes are known since the Early Eocene, more than 40 million years ago.

References

Sternoptychidae
Extant Eocene first appearances
Marine fish genera
Taxa named by David Starr Jordan
Taxa named by Barton Warren Evermann
Ray-finned fish genera